The 2020–21 season was FC Zorya Luhansk's 98th season in existence and the club's 15th consecutive season in the top flight of Ukrainian football. In addition to the domestic league, Zorya Luhansk participated in this season's editions of the Ukrainian Cup and the UEFA Europa League. The season covers the period from August 2020 to 30 June 2021.

Players

Squad information

Transfers

In

Out

Pre-season and friendlies

Competitions

Overview

Ukrainian Premier League

League table

Results summary

Results by round

Matches

Ukrainian Cup

UEFA Europa League

Group stage

The group stage draw was held on 2 October 2020.

Statistics

Appearances and goals

|-
! colspan=16 style=background:#dcdcdc; text-align:center| Goalkeepers

|-
! colspan=16 style=background:#dcdcdc; text-align:center| Defenders

|-
! colspan=16 style=background:#dcdcdc; text-align:center| Midfielders

|-
! colspan=16 style=background:#dcdcdc; text-align:center| Forwards

|-
! colspan=16 style=background:#dcdcdc; text-align:center| Players transferred out during the season

Last updated: 13 May 2021

Goalscorers

Last updated: 13 May 2021

Clean sheets

Last updated: 13 May 2021

Disciplinary record

Last updated: 13 May 2021

Attendances

Last updated: 13 May 2021

References

External links

FC Zorya Luhansk seasons
Zorya Luhansk
Zorya Luhansk